Mokhtar Khattab is the former Egyptian minister of public enterprise (1999–2004). He was appointed to the board of Telecom Egypt in 2004.

References 

Government ministers of Egypt
Living people
Year of birth missing (living people)